Kádár (Hungarian, 'cooper') is a Hungarian surname which may refer to:

 Ján Kadár, Slovak-Hungarian film director
 János Kádár (1912–1989), Hungarian politician, top leader during the communist era
 Flóra Kádár (1928–2002), Hungarian actress
 Kálmán Kádár, Romanian water polo player of Hungarian descent
 Matthias Kadar, a composer of German-Hungarian descent 
 Tamás Kádár, Hungarian footballer
 Zoltán Kádár, Romanian footballer of Hungarian descent
Gyula Kadar, Hungarian military officer during world war two

See also
 Kadar (disambiguation)
 Kádár (Hun judge)
 Kádár is the Hungarian name for Cadăr village, Tormac Commune, Timiș County, Romania

Hungarian-language surnames